Goran Vujević (born 27 February 1973) is a Serbian-Montenegrin volleyball player who competed for Yugoslavia in the 1996 Summer Olympics and in the 2000 Summer Olympics and for Serbia and Montenegro in the 2004 Summer Olympics.

He was born in Cetinje. In 1996, he was part of the Yugoslav team which won the bronze medal in the Olympic tournament. Four years later, in 2000, he won the gold medal with The Serbia and Montenegro team in the 2000 Olympic Games held in Sydney.

At the 2004 Games, he was a member of the Serbia and Montenegro team which was eliminated in the quarter-finals of the Olympic tournament.

References

External links
 

1973 births
Living people
Montenegrin men's volleyball players
Serbia and Montenegro men's volleyball players
Yugoslav men's volleyball players
Volleyball players at the 1996 Summer Olympics
Volleyball players at the 2000 Summer Olympics
Volleyball players at the 2004 Summer Olympics
Olympic volleyball players of Yugoslavia
Olympic volleyball players of Serbia and Montenegro
Olympic gold medalists for Federal Republic of Yugoslavia
Olympic bronze medalists for Federal Republic of Yugoslavia
Olympic medalists in volleyball
Olympiacos S.C. players
European champions for Serbia and Montenegro
Sportspeople from Cetinje
Serbs of Montenegro
Medalists at the 2000 Summer Olympics
Medalists at the 1996 Summer Olympics